Presidential elections were held in Dahomey from 9 March to 28 March 1970. Voting took place "in one province at a time" in Dahomey's six departments. However, on 28 March, the ruling military council suspended further voting because of violence between supporters of the three main candidates. At the time the voting was halted, Justin Ahomadégbé-Tomêtin of Dahomey's had received a plurality of the vote, but disagreements between factions in other parts of the country led to the results being annulled. The compromise announced by the military junta on 1 May was to appoint the three leading candidates – former Presidents Sourou-Migan Apithy and Hubert Maga, and former Prime Minister Ahomadégbé-Tomêtin – to a three-man Presidential Council to rule the country, rotating the presidency every two years, effectively declaring all three men as the election winners. Maga served the first two-year term, before handing over to Ahomadégbé in 1972, who was then removed from office by a coup led by Mathieu Kérékou later in the year. Voter turnout in the election was 56.7%.

Background
On 10 December 1969 President Émile Derlin Zinsou was overthrown by Maurice Kouandété, who had installed him as president in 1968. However, the military refused to recognise Kouandété. As the two men could not reach agreement, a Military Directorate was established with Paul-Émile de Souza as its chairman. Elections were organised to determine the true president.

Campaign
The three candidates were allowed to campaign, and they did not miss the chance. Intimidation and bribery were commonplace, and the electoral campaign saw the return of regional loyalties. It was also marked by a series of violent outbursts; invalidated reports state that six people were killed or wounded at incidents in Parakou on the eve of the elections. Fellow candidate Zinsou asserted that Maga supporters had killed one of his supporters during said incidents.

Results
The accusations made against him did not affect Maga's standing in the polls; he received a majority of the vote in the north, and Apithy and Ahomadégbé-Tomêtin received a majority in the southeast and southwest/central, respectively. The election results showed a victory for Maga with 252,551 votes, 200,091 for Ahomadégbé-Tomêtin, and 186,332 for Apithy. In the entire south, Maga received 24,000 votes compared to the 180,000 who voted for him in the Borgou Department, obtaining 97.3 percent of the 78 percent turnout. Zinsou, running to counter the constant tribal clashes, received 3 percent, with 17,551 votes.

Aftermath
Following the election, de Souza decided to nullify the results from Atakora, the region where Maga received the most votes, on 3 April. Outraged, Maga formed the Assembly of the Peoples of the North, which threatened to secede unless he was declared President. He refused to leave his campaign headquarters at Parakou even to attend political meetings. Maga's reaction to the nullification prompted many southern workers to flee the north. Apithy stated that he would convince his region to join Nigeria if Maga took the presidency and took steps to bribe his way into that office. Ahomadégbé-Tomêtin claimed Maga had defrauded the electoral system to his advantage. In contrast with the other three former presidents, Zinsou admitted that he had been defeated and decided participate in bargaining, explaining that he rejected the idea of a coalition "for personal reasons". The other former Presidents, on the other hand, agreed to a hasty compromise on 13 April to prevent a civil war.

References

Bibliography
.
.
.
.
.

Dahomey
1970 in the Republic of Dahomey
Presidential elections in Benin
Annulled elections